The 2009 Sudan Premier League is the 38th edition of the highest club level football competition in Sudan. The competition started on 18 February 2009 with a 1–1 draw between Al-Mourada and Merghani Kassala.
For the 2009 season, the number of teams has been expanded from 12 to 13 teams. Al-Merreikh are the defending champions.

Team information
 

Last updated: 6 April 2009

Standings
The last game of the first round is on Saturday May 16 before the mid-season break, after which the league resumed play with the 14th week/round on July 19.

Positions by round

Results

Season statistics

Goals

 Most goals scored by a player in a single game, 4:
 Ez alden Alhamri (Al-Hilal (Port Sudan)), home game against Al-Hilal (Kadougli) on February 18
 Abdelhamid Ammari (Al-Merreikh), home game against Al-Shimali on May 16
 262 goals scored through 6 August 2009 - Week #18

Wins
 Biggest home win:
 Al-Merreikh 6–1 Al-Shimali
 Biggest away win:
 Al-Hilal Omdurman 5–2 Al-Ahli (Wad Medani)

Top scorers

References

External links
 FIFA.com
 
 http://www.goalzz.com/main.aspx?c=4299&stage=1

Sudan Premier League seasons
Sudan
Sudan
football